Karnes Hollow is a tributary of Fishing Creek in Columbia County, Pennsylvania, in the United States. The stream is named after a valley whose etymology is unknown. The surficial geology in its vicinity consists of colluvium, alluvium, Illinoian Till, Illinoian Lag, and bedrock consisting of sandstone and shale.

Course
Karnes Hollow begins in a valley on Kramer Hill in Fishing Creek Township. It flows north for a short distance before turning north-northeast for several tenths of a mile. The stream then turns northeast for several tenths of a mile, entering Benton Township. It then turns east and reaches its confluence with Fishing Creek a few hundred feet further downstream.

Geography and geology

Along most of the length of Karnes Hollow, the surficial geology features colluvium. However, alluvium (which contains stratified sand, silt, and gravel, as well as some boulders), is present near the mouth of the stream. There are also some patches of Illinoian Till and Illinoian Lag in the middle and upper reaches of the watershed. The surficial geology everywhere else in the stream's vicinity consists of bedrock consisting of sandstone and shale.

Watershed
The stream is entirely within the United States Geological Survey quadrangle of Benton.

Karnes Hollow is located to the northwest of the community of Stillwater and some distance to the south of Benton. The stream is in the north-central part of Fishing Creek Township and in the east-central part of the quadrangle of Benton.

There are no roads crossing Karnes Hollow. However, Kramer Hill Road runs relatively close to the stream for its entire length, staying within several hundred feet of it and at times approaching to within .

History and etymology
Karnes Hollow was entered into the Geographic Names Information System on August 2, 1979. Its identifier in the Geographic Names Information System is 1178233.

Karnes Hollow is an unnamed stream that takes the name of the valley through which it flows. The etymology of the valley is unknown.

See also
Davis Hollow, next tributary of Fishing Creek going downstream
Culley Run, next tributary of Fishing Creek going upstream
List of tributaries of Fishing Creek (North Branch Susquehanna River)
List of rivers of Pennsylvania

References

Rivers of Columbia County, Pennsylvania
Tributaries of Fishing Creek (North Branch Susquehanna River)
Rivers of Pennsylvania